Narasaraopet railway station (station code:NRT), is an Indian Railways station in Narasaraopet of Andhra Pradesh. It lies on the Nallapadu–Nandyal section. The station is electrified as a part of guntur guntakal Electrification process. It is one of the stations in the division to be equipped with Automatic Ticket Vending Machines (ATVM's). It is administered under Guntur railway division of South Central Railway zone. It is classified as a D–category station in Guntur railway division.

References

External links 

Railway stations in Guntur district
Railway stations in Guntur railway division